Tabas Airport ( – Ferūdgāh-e Ţabas)  is an airport serving Tabas, a city in the South Khorasan Province of central Iran. For census purposes, it is a village in Montazeriyeh Rural District, in the Central District of Tabas County, South Khorasan Province. At the 2006 census, its population was 14, in 6 families.

Airlines and destinations

References

External links

 
 

Populated places in Tabas County
Airports in Iran
Buildings and structures in South Khorasan Province
Transportation in South Khorasan Province